Bingham is a civil parish in the Rushcliffe district of Nottinghamshire, England.  The parish contains 26 listed buildings that are recorded in the National Heritage List for England.   Of these, one is listed at Grade I, the highest of the three grades, and the others are at Grade II, the lowest grade.  The parish contains the market town of Bingham, and the most important building is a church, which is listed together with associated structures, including headstones in the churchyard.  The other listed buildings include houses and associated structures, shop and offices, a public house, a former school and teacher's house, a market cross, and two telephone kiosks.


Key

Buildings

References

Citations

Sources

 

Lists of listed buildings in Nottinghamshire
L